Lincoln Gilding (born 16 March 1992) is an Australian motorcycle racer. In 2012 he made his Grand Prix debut as a wildcard in the Australian Grand Prix at Phillip Island. He is a 2 time Australian Moto3 champion, winning championships in 2010 and 2012. He also competed in the 2013 Spanish CEV Repsol Championship on board a KTM Moto3 for Motorrika Chronos Corse Team.

Career statistics

Grand Prix motorcycle racing

By season

Races by year
(key)

References

External links
http://www.motogp.com/en/riders/Lincoln+Gilding
http://www.gpupdate.net/en/motogp-riders/1960/lincoln-gilding/

Australian motorcycle racers
Living people
1992 births
Moto3 World Championship riders